Romain Lejeune (born 21 May 1991) is a French professional footballer who plays as a goalkeeper. He previously played in Ligue 2 with Istres, and has also represented Wasquehal, Ivry, Fleury-Mérogis, Créteil, Athlético Marseille, SC Octeville-sur-Mer and Quevilly-Rouen.

References

External links
 
 Romain Lejeune at foot-national.com

1991 births
Living people
People from Drancy
Footballers from Seine-Saint-Denis
French footballers
Association football goalkeepers
Le Havre AC players
Wasquehal Football players
US Ivry players
FC Istres players
US Créteil-Lusitanos players
Athlético Marseille players
FC Fleury 91 players
ESM Gonfreville players
US Quevilly-Rouen Métropole players
Ligue 2 players
Championnat National players